Robert Alan Good NAM, NAS, AAAS (May 21, 1922 – June 13, 2003) was an American physician who performed the first successful human bone marrow transplant between persons who were not identical twins. He is regarded as a founder of modern immunology.

Early life and education
Good was born in Crosby, Minnesota, the second son of Ethel (née Whitcomb) and Roy Homer Good, who worked as educators. He attended the University of Minnesota and its medical school, receiving a B.A. degree in 1944, and M.D. and Ph.D. degrees in 1947. He was the first student to undertake a combined M.D.-Ph.D. curriculum at Minnesota.

While an undergraduate, he developed a polio-like illness that left him partially paralyzed. His mother pushed his wheelchair into his medical school classrooms. He eventually recovered from the illness, but retained a pronounced limp for the remainder of his life.

Research career
After obtaining his M.D. and Ph.D. degrees, Good undertook clinical training in pediatrics at the University of Minnesota Hospitals. After a fellowship year at the Rockefeller Institute for Medical Research, he returned to the University of Minnesota Medical School in 1950, where he engaged in research on the immune system. He was promoted in 1962 to the rank of professor in pediatrics, microbiology and pathology, and later also served as head of the Department of Pathology. In 1969 he was appointed as Regent's Professor, one of the highest recognitions of the University of Minnesota.

Among his accomplishments, in 1962 he documented the importance of the thymus gland, in 1965 he documented the important role of the tonsils in developing the immune defense systems of mammals including humans, and in 1968 he led the team that performed the first successful human bone marrow transplant between persons who were not identical twins. The patient who received the transplant was a 5-month-old boy with a profound immune deficiency that had earlier led to the deaths of eleven male members of his extended family. The boy received bone marrow transplanted from his 8-year-old sister. The transplant was successful and the boy grew up to become a healthy adult.

In 1972 he went to New York City to become president of the Sloan-Kettering Institute for Cancer Research. At Sloan-Kettering he continued his research into the human immune system. He remained at Sloan-Kettering until 1982, but his tenure there was marred by the discovery in 1974 of serious scientific fraud perpetrated by William T. Summerlin, a member of his lab who had previously worked with him at Minnesota. In 1982 he moved to the Cancer Research Program at the Oklahoma Medical Research Foundation in Oklahoma City, where he remained until 1985, when he became physician-in-chief at the All Children's Hospital in St. Petersburg, Florida, and chairman of pediatrics at The University of South Florida Medical School.

Academy and Institute memberships
Good was a member of the National Academy of Sciences (elected 1970), the American Academy of Arts and Sciences, and a charter member of the Institute of Medicine.

Personal life
Good died from esophageal cancer at age 81 in St. Petersburg, Florida. He was survived at the time by Noorbibi K. Day-Good, his second wife, five children from his first marriage to Jean Good, two step-children and 17 grandchildren.

Awards 

1955 E. Mead Johnson Award
1970 Albert Lasker Award for Clinical Medical Research
1970 Gairdner Foundation International Award.Gairdner Awardees
1970 Golden Plate Award of the American Academy of Achievement
1972 American College of Physicians Award  
1975 Cancer Research Institute William B. Coley Award
1987 John Howland Award

References

Further reading

External links
Robert A. Good Archives
The Robert A. Good Papers can be found at The Center for the History of Medicine at the Countway Library, Harvard Medical School.

1922 births
2003 deaths
People from Crosby, Minnesota
Members of the United States National Academy of Sciences
American immunologists
American medical researchers
Fellows of the American Academy of Arts and Sciences
University of Minnesota Medical School alumni
Deaths from esophageal cancer
Deaths from cancer in Florida
Recipients of the Lasker-DeBakey Clinical Medical Research Award
Members of the National Academy of Medicine